Charles Edward "Chuck" Commiskey (born March 2, 1958 in Killeen, Texas) is a former American football guard and center who played for three seasons in the National Football League for the New Orleans Saints from 1986–1988. He also played for three seasons in the United States Football League for the Philadelphia/Baltimore Stars from 1983–1985. He was drafted by the Philadelphia Eagles in the ninth round of the 1981 NFL Draft. He played college football at Ole Miss.

College career
On August 15, 1978, Ole Miss Rebels football head coach Steve Sloan announced that Commiskey would be suspended for the entire 1978 season for disciplinary reasons.

Professional career

Philadelphia Eagles
Commiskey was drafted by the Philadelphia Eagles in the ninth round of the 1981 NFL Draft. He was placed on injured reserve on August 25, 1981. He was waived on September 6, 1982.

Philadelphia/Baltimore Stars
After being released from the Eagles, Commiskey signed with the Philadelphia Stars of the United States Football League in 1983. In 1984, he was named to the USFL All-League Team. He played with the Stars until 1985 when the league folded. He was named second-team to the USFL All-Time Team.

New Orleans Saints
Commiskey was signed by the New Orleans Saints following the fold of the USFL in 1986. He was re-signed to a two-year contract on March 29, 1988.

References

1958 births
Living people
American football centers
American football offensive guards
Players of American football from Texas
Ole Miss Rebels football players
Philadelphia Eagles players
Philadelphia/Baltimore Stars players
New Orleans Saints players
Sportspeople from Killeen, Texas